Loiyangalani was a small town located on the southeastern coast of Lake Turkana in Kenya. The town has a population of 5,117. Loiyangalani means "a place of many trees" in the native Samburu tongue.  It is home to Turkana people and was founded near a freshwater spring in the 1960s where the El Molo people live. Its main industries include fishing, tourism and gold panning. It is a popular tourist destination in Northern Kenya, as the surrounding El Molo and Turkana villages offer unique (although somewhat commercialized) experiences.

In June 2008, the 1st Cultural Festival took place at Loiyangalani and united all tribes of the Lake in celebration for one weekend.

The town is home to an airstrip and lies near Mount Kulal (50 km), known for its forest and stones. There are a few Lodges in the area, the "Oasis Lodge", the "Palmshade Camp", the "Mosaretu Women's Groupe Lodge", and the "Sailo Bandas" all located only a few hundred meters from the airstrip.

Loiyangalani Division of Marsabit County is headquartered in Loiyangalani town. The town is sometimes spelled as Loyangalani.

Loiyangalani was the setting for John le Carré's novel The Constant Gardener, and was also a location for the film of the same title. In 2010, Loiyangalani was briefly made a district on its own from the former Laisamis district by the President of Kenya, Mwai Kibaki.

References

Populated places in Marsabit County
Lake Turkana